Wong Weng Son (born September 9, 1992) is a wushu taolu athlete from Malaysia. He is one of Malaysia's most renowned wushu athletes of all time and is a world champion in jianshu.

Career 
Wong's international debut was at the 2013 Southeast Asian Games in Nay Pyi Taw, Myanmar, where he won a silver medal in men's duilian. Two years later, he competed at the 2015 World Wushu Championships in Jakarta, Indonesia, where he was a triple medalist. A year later, Wong was finally able to win his first gold medal in international competition, doing so at the 1st Taolu World Cup in Fuzhou, China, in jianshu. At the 2017 World Wushu Championships, Wong became the world champion in jianshu and also won a silver medal in qiangshu. Despite being medal-less at the 2018 Asian Games where he competed in the men's changquan event, he was able to win two gold medals in jianshu and qiangshu at the 2nd Taolu World Cup in Yangon, Myanmar, later that year. 

In 2019, Wong became one of the few triple medalists at the 2019 World Wushu Championships in Shanghai, China, winning three silver medals in his specializations. A few weeks later at the 2019 Southeast Asian Games, Wong earned the silver medal men's changquan but missed the gold medal by 0.04 points.

References

External links 
Athlete profile at the 2018 Asian Games

1992 births
Living people
Malaysian martial artists
Malaysian wushu practitioners
Wushu practitioners at the 2018 Asian Games
Southeast Asian Games silver medalists for Malaysia
Islamic Solidarity Games competitors for Malaysia
Southeast Asian Games medalists in wushu